Pupinidae is a taxonomic family of land snails with an operculum, terrestrial gastropod mollusks in the superfamily Cyclophoroidea (according to the taxonomy of the Gastropoda by Bouchet & Rocroi, 2005).

Distribution 
The distribution of the family Pupinidae includes the Himalayas, Assam, Myanmar, peninsular Malaysia, Sumatra, Borneo, Philippines, Vietnam, Thailand, Australia, Melanesia, Micronesia and Papua New Guinea.

Taxonomy 

Subfamilies and genera within the family Pupinidae include (according to the taxonomy of the Gastropoda by Bouchet & Rocroi, 2005):

Pupininae L. Pfeiffer, 1853
 Alpinipupina Stanisic, 2010
 Barnaia Thach, 2017
 Callianella R. B. Newton, 1891
 Cordillerapina Stanisic, 2010
 Hargravesia H. Adams, 1871
 Hildapina Iredale, 1940
 Ischurostoma Bourguignat, 1874
 Moulinsia Grateloup, 1840
 Necopupina Iredale, 1937
 Porocallia Möllendorff, 1893
 Pupina Vingard, 1829 - type genus of the subfamily Pupininae
 Signepupina Iredale, 1937
 Siphonostyla Kobelt, 1897
 Tylotoechus Kobelt & Möllendorff, 1897

Liareinae Powell, 1946 - synonym: Cytoidae Climo, 1969 (n.a.) = not available name

Pollicariinae Thiele, 1929
 Pollicaria Gould, 1856
 Hybocystis Benson, 1859: synonym of Pollicaria A.A. Gould, 1856

Pupinellinae Kobelt, 1902 - synonyms: Ventriculidae Wenz, 1915, Pollicariini Thiele, 1929
 Barnaia Thach, 2017
 Bellardiella Tapparone Canefri, 1883
 Coptocheilus Gould, 1862
 Csomapupa Páll-Gergely, 2015
 Didomasta Iredale, 1941
 Hedleya Cox, 1892
 † Kallomastoma Stache, 1889 
 Nodopomatias Gude, 1921
 Pseudopomatias Möllendorff, 1885
 Pupinella Gray [in Baird], 1850 - type genus of the subfamily Pupinellinae
 Raphaulus Pfeiffer, 1856
 Scaeopupina Iredale, 1941
 Schistoloma Kobelt, 1902: synonym of Coptocheilus A. Gould, 1862 (unnecessary replacement name)
 Streptaulus Benson, 1857
 Tortulosa Gray, 1847
 Vargapupa Páll-Gergely, 2015

subfamily incertae sedis
 Suavocallia Iredale, 1933
(extinct) Cretatortulosa Yu, Wang and Pan, 2018 Burmese amber, Myanmar, Cenomanian.

Ecology 
These snails live in wet forests in leaf litter.

References 

 Bank, R. (2017). Classification of the Recent terrestrial Gastropoda of the World. Last update: July 16, 2017

External links